The Charity Chapel, better known as Capilla del Hospital Maciel, is a Roman Catholic chapel in Montevideo, Uruguay.

Overview
Run by the Sisters Hospitaller of the Sacred Heart of Jesus, it is part of the Maciel Hospital. 

The images venerated are: Our Lady of Mercy (main altar), Our Lady of Mount Carmel, Our Lady of the Rosary, Our Lady of Sorrows, Christ, Saint Anthony, Saint Francis of Paola, and Saint Eligius (patron saint of the metalworkers, who donated the image). The baptismal fonts are made of giant tridacna valves.

In 1825 the Chapel was visited by Count Giovanni Maria Mastai-Ferretti, the future Pope Pius IX.

Bibliography
 Guía Arquitectónica y Urbanística de Montevideo. 3rd Edition. Intendencia Municipal de Montevideo, 2008, p. 51, 132.

References

External links

 Padrón 2605B - Capilla de la Caridad - Hospital Maciel 

Ciudad Vieja, Montevideo
Roman Catholic church buildings in Montevideo
Neoclassical architecture in Uruguay
Roman Catholic chapels in Uruguay